was a Japanese samurai during the Sengoku period.  He was the head of the Yūki clan.

Early life
He was the son of Yūki Masatomo.

Daimyo
As clan leader, Masakatsu developed a code of provincial laws (bunkoku-hō).  In 1556, he published .

References

Daimyo
1503 births
1559 deaths
Yūki clan